The Chester General rail crash occurred on 8 May 1972 at Chester, northwest England, resulting in extensive fire damage, but no casualties. It was caused by brake failure through human error.

Course of events

The 19:31 freight train from Ellesmere Port to Mold Junction consisted of 38 wagons hauled by a Class 24 diesel locomotive no. 5028. The first five wagons were tank wagons containing kerosene, petrol and gas oil.

At around 20:50 the train was approaching Chester station (then known as Chester General) on a 1 in 100 falling gradient when the driver discovered that the brakes had failed. It ran past a signal at danger and through a set of points which were set for no. 11 bay platform, where an empty diesel multiple unit was standing.

As there was nothing more he could do, the driver jumped out onto the platform with the train still travelling at around 20 mph. It ploughed straight into the DMU and completely destroyed the first coach. The second coach was torn from its bogies and thrown up onto the platform where it demolished the refreshment room wall. There were very few people on that part of the station, although the staff in the refreshment room had to shelter themselves from falling masonry.

A major fire broke out when the burst fuel tanks of the trains ignited, but the fire brigade were based nearby and arrived within a couple of minutes. They were able to rescue a trapped postal worker and evacuated several passengers from an adjacent lightly loaded train before it too was engulfed by the fire.

Damage caused to the trains was severe, especially after petrol from two of the tank wagons began to boil and was forced out of the pressure relief valves, whereupon it ignited. The fire was not  extinguished until 00:20 the following day.

The trains involved were all written off and a section of the station roof was damaged and consequently removed.

Causes

The first eight wagons were equipped with the vacuum brake but the pipes had not been connected. The train had run from Ellesmere Port as an unbraked freight train and stopped at Helsby, where it needed to reverse. The guard had forgotten to connect the vacuum pipes when the locomotive coupled up to the opposite end of the train, so that extra brake power was not available on the falling gradient into Chester. The driver had also omitted to carry out a brake test before departure.

External links
 YouTube video showing the damage caused by the crash.

See also

 Lists of rail accidents
 List of British rail accidents

References
 

Railway accidents and incidents in Cheshire
Runaway train disasters
History of Chester
Railway accidents in 1972
1972 in England
20th century in Cheshire
Train collisions in England
Train and rapid transit fires